Takumi Hasegawa may refer to:

, Japanese basketball player
, Japanese footballer